The Dictator is a 1935 British historical drama film directed by Victor Saville and starring Clive Brook, Madeleine Carroll, Emlyn Williams and Helen Haye. The film depicts a dramatic episode in  Danish history: the tumultuous relationship between King Christian VII of Denmark and his English consort Caroline Matilda in 18th century Copenhagen and the Queen's tragic affair with the royal physician and liberal reformer Johann Friedrich Struensee. The film is loosely based on real events.
In the United States the title was changed to “Loves of a Dictator”.

Cast
 Clive Brook – Doctor Struensee
 Madeleine Carroll – Caroline Matilde of Denmark
 Emlyn Williams – Christian VII of Denmark
 Helen Haye – Queen Mother Juliana
 Frank Cellier – Sir Murray Keith
 Isabel Jeans – Elisabet von Eyben
 Alfred Drayton – Count Brandt
 Nicholas Hannen – Guldberg, the Prime Minister
 Ruby Miller – Hilda
 Heather Thatcher – Lady
 James Carew – Minor role

See also
 A Royal Affair, a 2012 film based on the same events
 The Love of a Queen (1923)
 King in Shadow (1957)

References

External links
 

1935 films
1930s historical drama films
British historical drama films
Cultural depictions of Christian VII of Denmark
Cultural depictions of Caroline Matilda of Great Britain
Films directed by Victor Saville
Films set in Denmark
Films set in Copenhagen
Films set in the 1760s
Films set in the 1770s
Ealing Studios films
Adultery in films
Biographical films about royalty
British black-and-white films
1935 drama films
1930s English-language films
1930s British films